FIFA International Soccer is a 1993 association football video game developed by EA Canada's Extended Play Productions team and published by Electronic Arts. The game was released for the Sega Mega Drive/Genesis console in December 1993 and ported to numerous other systems in 1994. It is the first game in the FIFA series.

The original Mega Drive version was commercially successful in Europe, becoming the best-selling home 1993 in the United Kingdom. The game was also positively received by critics upon release; critics lauded the detail and animation of the footballers in the game, the crowd sound effects, and the overall presentation. The speed the game ran at and issues with the response to the player's input were seen as the game's primary faults. The 3DO version added multiple camera views and more detailed graphics than other versions. The game sold well, with the Mega Drive version becoming the best-selling home video game of 1993 in the United Kingdom. It later served as a pack-in game for the Goldstar 3DO, and led to a sequel, FIFA Soccer 95.

Gameplay 

FIFA International Soccer simulates the sport of association football. In particular, the game is based on international matches. The game utilises an isometric viewpoint, unlike other football games at the time such as Tehkan World Cup or Sensible Soccer which utilised a bird's-eye view or Kick Off which used a top-down view. The player controls one of the eleven footballers on their team at a time, with the ability to switch players on command. The game allows up to four human players at the same time, each controlling a different footballer. The players can choose to control a footballer on the same team or on opposing teams. The remaining footballers are controlled by the computer.

Four modes of play — Exhibition, Tournament, Playoffs, and League — are available. Exhibition engages the player in a single match. Tournament mode resembles the format of the FIFA World Cup, UEFA European Championship, with the player controlling a team of their choice through a series of matches, starting with three group games with the possibility of progressing to four further games in a knockout format. Playoffs mode takes the same form, but skips the group games and starts at the first knockout game. League consists of eight teams who contest a double round-robin tournament.

The game features 76 national teams in total, plus a team called EA All Stars. Every team has 20 players. The players are fictional (some of them, e.g. Tim Ansell of England or Joe Della-Savia of Italy, are named after people credited as the development team) and look the same, except for darker skin of certain teams' players. There is also commentary from Tony Gubba (PC CD-ROM version).

An oversight by the developers makes it easy to score a goal by making a player stand in front of the opponent's goalkeeper when he holds the ball in his hands and is about to clear it away. The computer-controlled goalkeeper will kick the ball to the opposing player, giving the other an easy chance to score.

Playable nations 
There are 105 national teams in the game:

AFC
 
 
 
 
 
 
 
 
 
 
 
 
 
 
CAF
 
 
 
 
 
 
 
 
 
 
 
 
 
 
CONCACAF
 
 
 
 
 
 
 
 
 
 
 
 
 
 
 
CONMEBOL
 
 
 
 
 
 
 
 
 
 
OFC
 
 
 
 
 
 
UEFA

Development 
Electronic Arts (EA) had first ventured in the sports games market in 1988 with an American football title, John Madden Football. Updated versions of the game, along with golf and ice hockey games, followed under the EASN (Electronic Arts Sports Network) banner. EA's European arm carried out research into the possibility of a sports game that would appeal to European audiences and decided that an association football game would stand the best chance of success, predicting high sales figures. EA US gave the go-ahead for the project to proceed, and a team of ten developers at EA's Canadian studios began work on the project led by Bruce McMillan. Initially, the development took place for the Sega Mega Drive/Genesis under the working title of EA Soccer, with a small budget of around $50,000-$100,000. The football game market leader at the time was Sensible Soccer, followed by Kick Off, which both used top-down viewpoints. EA's UK team looked at both games, but felt they needed to do something different to set themselves apart, by adding more realism and an isometric viewpoint.

Other EA Sports titles held official licences from the leagues depicted to allow real team names, players and stadia to be included, and with a view to securing the same for their football title, EA signed a five-year deal with football's governing body, FIFA. The deal involved "minuscule" royalty payments, and on further inspection the reason became clear. The license didn't include any team names, logos, player names, likenesses or stadia. The game would therefore only include national teams identified by country names and flags, and player names would be made up – several of the developers added their own names into the game. The licence for the forthcoming 1994 FIFA World Cup tournament was held by US Gold and their game was due for a Spring 1994 release in time for the tournament which was to take place in Summer 1994. EA decided they would need to bring forward their game ahead of the US Gold title, and aimed for a Christmas 1993 release.

Questioning the recognition that the FIFA licence held in North America, EA suggested the game be released as Team USA Soccer in North America. Fearing a sales flop, they reversed the decision and decided to release the game worldwide under the FIFA International Soccer title, providing the option of moving unsold stock to other markets. Development of the game was completed in November 1993.

In June 1995, Atari Corporation struck a deal with EA to bring select titles from their catalog to the Atari Jaguar CD, with FIFA International Soccer being among them, however, this version was never released due to the commercial and critical failure of the Atari Jaguar platform.

Reception

Sales 
EA initially anticipated sales of around 300,000 copies of the game in Europe. Upon release for the Sega Mega Drive, sales surpassed expectations. In the United Kingdom, the game sold 400,000 copies in the last two weeks of December, becoming the fifth best-selling home video game of 1993 in the United Kingdom. It went on to sell more than 500,000 copies in its first four weeks. The game remained number-one on the UK console charts through early 1994.

In the United States, it topped the Super NES sales chart in June 1994.

Critical 

FIFA International Soccer received mostly positive comments from the press. Reviewing the original Mega Drive version, Edge magazine praised the way the crowd sounds reacted to the play on the field as well as the visual detail of the players and their animations with the isometric view. They highlighted that this did make for a slower game than one using a top-down view and described it a more of a simulator than a console game. Mean Machines Sega described the game as the "greatest soccer game yet seen", praising the "superlative presentation" and the "utterly amazing" animation. With only minor concerns around the response time to the players input and the lack of an on-screen clock graphic, they awarded a score of 94%. Computer Gaming World in June 1994 said "this is stunning. FIFA ... is a remarkably complete simulation of the sport". The magazine stated that "In no other game can you achieve such a high degree of pinpoint accuracy when passing", and praised players executing offensive or defensive stance depending on location.

Next Generation reviewed the Super NES version of the game, rating it four stars out of five, and stated that "FIFA International Soccer for the Super NES is a great game. With its extremely fast action, sharp graphics, and sensible gameplay, this title is a winner." GamePro gave the SNES version a positive review, commenting that "Strong and varied game play makes this the most realistic soccer game for the SNES." They also praised the graphics, animation, digitized crowd chants, and accessibility to players of all skill levels. They later commented that the Sega CD version is essentially identical to the Genesis and SNES versions aside from the addition of some full-motion video clips, but that this is not a bad thing because the previous versions didn't leave any room for improvement.

Next Generation reviewed the 3DO version, and noted that this port differed considerably from the original Genesis version and most other ports, with the addition of multiple views, a rotating-camera effect and more detailed graphics. They described it as the "killer-app graphics showhorse" for the 3DO console, awarding it a maximum five star score. GamePro similarly remarked "FIFA 3DO is no mere port-over from the cartridge market." They especially praised the highly detailed graphics, multiple views, realistic gameplay, and six-player support.

Reviewing the Amiga port, most publications spoke favourably of the game's appearance. Amiga Power, CU Amiga and The One magazines all highlighted the amount of disk swapping required to play the game as a drawback. Reaction to the changes in the controls required to adapt from the three buttons available on the Mega Drive controller to the single button common on most Amiga joysticks were mixed. Amiga Format said of hitting the button in an attempt to shoot at the goal, "occasionally the ball flies into the onion bag; other times it seems you are just passing the ball to the keeper." Amiga Power described the outcome of pressing the button as random. The One, however, describes the control system as "excellent – to the point that it's easier to control" in comparison to the Mega Drive.

Accolades 
In 1996, Next Generation listed the Genesis and 3DO versions as number 71 on their "Top 100 Games of All Time", saying it "put 3DO on the map after a year of disappointing titles for the system, and ... breathed life into EA's flagging sports line-up." They cited the zooming camera angles and the ability to have up to six players on the 3DO version as highlights. VideoGames awarded it Best 3DO Game of 1994. In 1995, Total! ranked the game 18th in their "Top 100 SNES Games."  They praised the isometric graphics that gave the game more realistic and better animated  visuals and praised the sound effects. In 1995, Flux magazine rated the 3DO version 53rd on its Top 100 Video Games writing: "Player Controllable camera angles help make FIFA 3DO, without a doubt, the most advanced sports title to date."

Legacy 
A sequel, FIFA Soccer 95, was released in July 1994 exclusively for the Mega Drive/Genesis. This started the FIFA series, with a new game released every year since in the main series, alongside spin-off series games based around a particular tournament. The series passed 100 million total sales in 2010, and EA's licence to use the FIFA title runs through to 2022. The Sega Genesis version was included in the PlayStation 2 version of FIFA 06, which has been referred as FIFA 94.

References 

1993 video games
Amiga games
Articles containing video clips
Association football video games
Cancelled Atari Jaguar games
DOS games
FIFA (video game series)
Creative Assembly games
EA Sports games
Electronic Arts games
Game Boy games
Master System games
Pack-in video games
Sega CD games
Game Gear games
Sega Genesis games
Super Nintendo Entertainment System games
Tiertex Design Studios games
Video games developed in Canada
Video games scored by Jeff van Dyck